Acton is a hamlet in the Borough of Newcastle-under-Lyme, Staffordshire.

It lies four miles south west of Newcastle close to the junction of the A53 and the A5182,  Trentham Road.

Newcastle-under-Lyme District Council has an open windrow facility in Acton  where it composts garden waste collected in the borough into a nutrient rich soil improver for local farms and other places  including Trentham Gardens.

There is a redundant church in the village bearing the inscription Wesleyan Church.
 It is now a private house. The Acton Hall Equestrian Centre  is located in the village too.

References

External links

Hamlets in Staffordshire
Borough of Newcastle-under-Lyme